Toy Story 2: Buzz Lightyear to the Rescue is a platform game based on Pixar's 1999 computer animated film Toy Story 2. It was released for the Nintendo 64, PlayStation, Microsoft Windows, and Macintosh in late 1999, while a Dreamcast version followed in 2000. The computer versions were released under the title Disney/Pixar's Action Game, Toy Story 2. A different version, a side-scrolling platform game titled Toy Story 2, was also released for the Game Boy Color in 1999.

Toy Story 2: Buzz Lightyear to the Rescue has been re-released several times as a downloadable game for PlayStation consoles, including the PlayStation 3 and PlayStation Portable in 2011, the PlayStation Vita in 2012, and PlayStation 4. Additionally, the game was officially ported to the PlayStation 5 in 2022 for PlayStation Plus Premium tier users, and can be accessed in the classic games library.

Gameplay 
The home console and computer version puts the player in control of Buzz Lightyear as he goes across fifteen levels (consisting of ten main levels and five boss levels) based on and inspired by locations from the film in order to rescue Woody. Buzz can attack enemies with a wrist laser, which can be charged up for additional power, and can also be aimed through a first-person viewpoint. Buzz also has a spin attack, which can be charged up into a continuous spin. Buzz is also able to extend his wings to perform a double jump, and can perform a foot stomp to activate switches. The player can pick up a laser power-up that gives Buzz a limited supply of powered up laser shots, as well as health-replenishing batteries and extra lives.

The main aim of the game is to collect Pizza Planet tokens which are located throughout stages. Each level has 5 Pizza Planet tokens, which are each collected by completing different objectives, such as fighting a mini-boss, solving a puzzle for getting a secret token, completing a timed challenge or winning a race against another character, or helping a character find 5 of a certain object which are hidden throughout a level. Each level also has a number of coins placed throughout it, 50 of which can be collected and given to Hamm for a token. Certain objectives require the use of a special power-up that must first be unlocked in a certain level by retrieving one of Mr. Potato Head's missing body parts. Power-ups include a barrier that protects Buzz from damage, rocket boots that launch him at high speeds, a disk launcher that homes in on enemies, a grappling hook for climbing up high ledges, and hover boots for floating up to high places. While only one Pizza Planet token is needed to clear a level, some levels require a certain number of tokens to unlock. With the exception of the Nintendo 64 version, progressing through each level unlocks FMV clips of scenes taken from the film. The Nintendo 64 version instead features screenshots from the film accompanied by text, shown in between levels, due to storage limitations of the Nintendo 64 cartridge.

Plot

The game's plot is relative to the Toy Story 2 film, and begins at Andy's house as Al McWhiggin steals Woody from the family's yard sale. Buzz Lightyear, Hamm, Rex, Slinky, and Mr. Potato Head venture out to find and rescue Woody. After leaving Andy's house, the toys enter the neighborhood in which Andy lives, then proceed to Al's Toy Barn, the penthouse where Al lives and finally the airport terminal and tarmac where the movie ends. Stinky Pete (a.k.a. the Prospector) appears as the game's final boss along with two of his in-game henchmen.

Development and release
In July 1998, Activision licensed the rights to create a video game based on Toy Story 2. The game was developed by Traveller's Tales and published by Activision. Traveller's Tales had previously developed the original Toy Story video game. The home console versions were released as Toy Story 2: Buzz Lightyear to the Rescue!, while versions for Microsoft Windows and Macintosh were released under the title Disney/Pixar's Action Game, Toy Story 2.

Development had been underway for some time as of March 1999. The PlayStation and Nintendo 64 versions were unveiled at the Electronic Entertainment Expo in May 1999. In the United States, the game was released for PlayStation, Nintendo 64, Windows, and Macintosh in November 1999, coinciding with the film's theatrical release. In Europe, the PlayStation and Nintendo 64 versions were released on 4 February 2000.

Activision also released a Dreamcast version. This version was delayed and ultimately released in the U.S. in July 2000. It is a port of the PlayStation version, and was also developed by Traveller's Tales and published by Activision.

In March 2011, Toy Story 2: Buzz Lightyear to the Rescue! was re-released through the PlayStation Network as a PS one Classic, available for download on PlayStation 3 and PlayStation Portable consoles. In August 2012, it received a downloadable re-release for PlayStation Vita through the European PlayStation Store, while a U.S. Vita re-release followed in January 2013. In Asia, it was re-released in May 2022, as a downloadable game for PlayStation 4 and PlayStation 5, via the PlayStation Plus service.

Controversy
Following its initial release, the game created controversy for its inclusion of a villain character whose design featured a mustache, a bullet bandolier and a sombrero. In late November 1999, a peaceful protest with more than 120 people was held outside Activision's headquarters by Mestizo activists who perceived the character as an offensive stereotype towards Mexicans. Activision and Disney stated that the character's appearance would be altered in future copies of the game; there were no plans to recall or amend current copies.

Reception

The PlayStation version of Toy Story 2: Buzz Lightyear to the Rescue! received positive reviews, while the Nintendo 64 and Dreamcast versions received "Mixed or average reviews", according to aggregating review website Metacritic. Official Nintendo Magazine, reviewing the Nintendo 64 release, called it "a smart platformer that's packed with wacky worlds and cool bosses", but also stated its low difficulty level may deter experienced gamers of the platform genre.

The home console/computer version was criticized for its awkward camera, and the limited number of repetitive phrases used by non-playable characters throughout the game. Critics praised the PlayStation version for its graphics and FMV clips, and considered it superior to the Nintendo 64 version, noting its lack of clips. Levi Buchanan of GameFan called the PlayStation version "a wonderfully detailed" game with "bright, crisp graphics, incredible audio, and some fantastic movie cutscenes". Buchanan criticized the Nintendo 64 version for blurry textures and "abysmal" pop-up, and stated that the frame rate affected character animations. In addition, Buchanan criticized the Nintendo 64 version's sounds, music, and sluggish camera, and stated that the poor graphics hindered the gameplay. Official Nintendo Magazine appreciated the Nintendo 64 release's upbeat music, vibrant color palette of the levels as well as the "smart" boss design, but admitted the graphics looked "grainy" in some areas. Matt Casamassina of IGN also criticized the Nintendo 64 version's pop-up and frame rate, and stated that the game had "washed out visuals and a decidedly blurry look" in comparison to the PlayStation version; he believed that the latter version also had superior controls. Chris Hudak of The Electric Playground praised the game's large levels but criticized them for not being interactive enough.

Critics for Game Informer reviewed the PlayStation version and praised the FMV cutscenes and levels, but criticism was directed at the repetitive gameplay. Game Informer praised the "enjoyable" gameplay of the Nintendo 64 version, but also considered it to be monotonous and too easy, while criticizing the lack of cutscenes. AllGame's Brett Alan Weiss praised the PlayStation version for the camera, controls, level design, and the cutscenes, and stated that the character voices, "though redundant, are a plus". However, he considered the game too easy for hardcore gamers. Glenn Wigmore of AllGame praised the Nintendo 64 version for its graphics, sound effects, and control, but was critical of the game's music, considering it to be repetitive.

The Dreamcast version was criticized for its difficult controls, including the overly sensitive analog stick, making it difficult to move Buzz in a straight line. Miguel Lopez of GameSpot believed the Dreamcast version had "cleaner-looking" FMV clips but was disappointed that it was essentially the same game as the Nintendo 64 and PlayStation versions, while IGN's Jeremy Dunham believed that the Dreamcast version had better graphics than the previous versions. GamePro criticized the Dreamcast version for its graphics and monotonous music. Jeremy Bell of AllGame called the Dreamcast version a "generic-looking dud" and considered the cutscenes to be the game's only "quality graphics". Bell criticized the game graphics for monotonous scenery and bland surface textures and stated that the game had low resolution considering it was developed for the Dreamcast. Bell also criticized the unoriginal gameplay. PlanetDreamcast praised the game's film clips, but criticized its VMU interface, and stated that the game would only appeal to young children. Greg Orlando of Next Generation called the Dreamcast version a "shoddy port" with graphics "barely better" than the PlayStation version, while Shaun Conlin of The Electric Playground called it "a port of a game that wasn't very good in the first place".

Noah Robischon of Entertainment Weekly criticized the Windows version for installation problems. PC Zone wrote that while the game did not reinvigorate the platform genre, it was "definitely a cut above most merchandising tie-ins". Cathy Lu of MacAddict reviewed the Macintosh version and considered it to be addictive. Lu praised the graphics but criticized clipping problems and the jerky camera, as well as high system requirements to play the game.

It was among the top 10 best-selling PlayStation games of December 1999. The PlayStation version received a "Gold" sales award from the Entertainment and Leisure Software Publishers Association (ELSPA), indicating sales of at least 200,000 copies in the United Kingdom.

See also
List of Disney video games

Notes

References

External links 

Toy Story 2 (PlayStation) can be played for free in the browser on the Internet Archive

1999 video games
3D platform games
Activision games
Buzz Lightyear
Disney controversies
Video game controversies
Disney video games
Dreamcast games
Nintendo 64 games
PlayStation (console) games
PlayStation Network games
Toy Story video games
Traveller's Tales games
THQ games
Tiertex Design Studios games
Windows games
Video games based on animated films
Video games with alternative versions
Video game sequels
Race-related controversies in video games
Single-player video games
Video games scored by Andy Blythe and Marten Joustra
Video games developed in the United Kingdom